WarCry is a Spanish power metal band formed in 2001 after Víctor García and Alberto Ardines were ejected from Avalanch. WarCry has released five studio albums, one live album, one demo (released in 1997 while being just a side project from the members original bands), and one music video. This list does not include material performed by members or former members of WarCry that was recorded with Avalanch, DarkSun, Relative Silence, Darna, or Sauze.

Self-titled debut album WarCry was released on April 17, 2002. Guitarists Pablo García and Fernando Mon appeared only as guest musicians on the debut album, but became full-time members on 2002 along with keyboardist Manuel Ramil and bassist Alvaro Jardón. Second album El Sello De Los Tiempos was released on December 1, 2002. At the end of 2003, Jardón left the band due to musical and personal issues. On January 1, 2004 was released the third album  Alea Jacta Est striking all the music stores around Spain. On the first concert of the tour supporting the album, the band presented Roberto García, formerly of Avalanch, as Jardón's replacement. Their fourth studio album, ¿Dónde Está La Luz?, was released on February 1, 2005, considered by critics "their heaviest album to date". They embarked on a supporting tour throughout Spain. WarCry played a sold-concert in Madrid. That performance was released on February 27, 2006 as a live album, named Directo A La Luz and soon was certified gold. La Quinta Esencia was their fifth album, released on September 18, 2006 with a great acceptance by the fans and the press, taking them to the highest positions on the Spanish charts. Sixth album was set to be released on May/June, 2008, but after the lineup changes they pushed it back to September, 2008. Víctor García stated that "this album will express much duality in human beings — good and evil."

Albums

Studio albums

Compilation albums

Live albums

Music videos

Demos

References
Spain-WarCry's Official Website

Heavy metal group discographies
Discography
Discographies of Spanish artists